Goldbug is an unincorporated community located in Whitley County, Kentucky, United States.

A post office was established in the community in 1896. The name Goldbug is thought to refer to supporters of the central gold standard issue in the 1896 United States presidential election.

References

Unincorporated communities in Whitley County, Kentucky
Unincorporated communities in Kentucky